The 1971 Tipperary Senior Hurling Championship was the 81st staging of the Tipperary Senior Hurling Championship since its establishment by the Tipperary County Board in 1887.

Roscrea were the defending champions.

Moyne-Templetuohy won the championship after a 2-08 to 0-06 defeat of Roscrea in the final at Semple Stadium. It remains their only championship title.

References

Tipperary
Tipperary Senior Hurling Championship